Kata Kalivoda (1877-1936) was a Hungarian artist.

Biography
Kalivoda was born on 6 April 1877 in Letenye. She studied art in Budapest at the Mintarajziskolában (School of Design) and the Női Festőiskolában (School of Women's Painting). She traveled to Munich and Paris to study. She spent time at the Artists' Colony in Nagybánya where she was taught by Simon Hollósy. Kalivoda died on 11 May 1936  in Szurdokpüspöki.

Gallery

References

1877 births
1936 deaths
People from Zala County
19th-century women artists
20th-century Hungarian women artists
Austro-Hungarian artists